AM, the Australian Broadcasting Corporation's flagship current-affairs radio program, is one of Australia's longest-running productions. Its tagline is Ensure you are informed.

History and timeslots
AM was first broadcast in 1967 for what were then ABC Radio 1 and Radio 3 (now ABC Local Radio). Aired every morning at 8 am (after the 7.45 am news bulletin), it soon became Australia's most-popular morning radio current-affairs program.

Two years later, ABC Radio's evening current-affairs program, PM was created as a companion program. It is now the ABC's flagship evening current affairs program.

AM was later introduced to ABC Radio 2 (now Radio National) with a new early edition at 7.05 am after the 7 am news. In recent times, the 7 am news was lengthened from the standard 5-minute duration to 10 minutes, meaning that Radio National's edition of AM had to be truncated to 20 minutes in length. As a result of this, the early edition carries one or two fewer stories than the full 25 minute long 8:05 am edition, still broadcast on ABC Local Radio.

The Radio National edition of AM is broadcast during Radio National's RN Breakfast, which is presented by journalist Fran Kelly.

AM is also broadcast on Saturday mornings at the same time on Radio National, 7.10 am, as This Week. Like its weekday counterpart, This Week is also presented at 8 am on Local Radio. AM is not broadcast on Sundays.

The programme is compiled every morning at 5 am for its early bulletin at 6.05 am. It is presented live three times a day - 6.05 am, 7.10 am and 8:05 am with live updates for other states as required.

The 6.05 am edition, known as Early AM, is a 10-minute program broadcast on Local Radio networks after the 6 am news. Like the Radio National edition of AM, the early edition features fewer stories than the complete edition at 8 am and features three reports at most.

The Local Radio edition of AM is broadcast during Local Radio's Breakfast in Sydney program, along with Triple J's breakfast program in the studio as a part of the youth network.

Transcripts, streaming and podcasting
The ABC's streaming links and MP3 podcasts have allowed people to access and listen to the latest AM programme for 24 hours after it was first broadcast as streaming Windows Media or RealAudio. In addition to this streaming capability, MP3 podcasts are available of both the full programme and selected individual reports.

MP3s and streams of reports dating back up to two years are also available. Transcripts of reports dating from 16 June 1999, too, are available online.

Presenters
Past presenters include:
 Robert Peach (1967-1974)
 Brian Wright (1968)
 Bill Dowsett (1973-1975)
 Hamish Robertson (1976)
 Kel Richards (1977-1978)
 Steve Cosser (1979-1980)
 Red Harrison (1981-1986)
 John Highfield (1986-1987)
 Peter Thompson (1988-1993)
 Ellen Fanning (1994-1996)
 Peter Cave (1997-2001)
 Linda Mottram (2001-2003)
 Tony Eastley (2004-2014)
 Chris Uhlmann (2014-2015)
  Michael Brissenden (2015-2016)
 Sabra Lane (2017–present)

This Week (Saturday) 

In August 2021, Saturday AM was renamed to This Week.
 Linda Mottram 
 Elizabeth Jackson (2004-2018, also producer)
  Thomas Oriti (2018, also producer)

Musical signature themes
The original 1967 signature was "Crossbeat", a 30-second electronic music piece sourced from the BBC, composed and realised by David Cain of the BBC Radiophonic Workshop. The current themes for both AM and PM are two of the most recognisable in Australia. The two themes, composed by Tony Ansell and Peter Wall (who composed many themes for the ABC News and Current Affairs Department in the 1980s). The similarity between the themes represents a significant link between the sister programmes.

References

External links
 AM website
 Radio National's AM website
 Radio National's Saturday AM website
 ABC News and Current Affairs programs

ABC News and Current Affairs
Australian Broadcasting Corporation radio programs
1967 establishments in Australia